David A. Hancock (born April 25, 1945) is a Minnesota politician and former member of the Minnesota House of Representatives. A member of the Republican Party of Minnesota, he represented District 2A in northwestern Minnesota.

Early life, education, and career
Hancock attended Anderson University in Anderson, Indiana, graduating with a Bachelor of Arts in History in 1968. He enlisted in the United States Army from 1969–1971, serving as an operating room technician and combat medic at Fort Sill near Lawton, Oklahoma. He also taught 8th grade American History and 9th grade Civics at Conrad Ball Junior High School in Loveland, Colorado from 1968–1969 and 1971–1972. He is general manager of Northwest Tire in Bemidji, and was the owner of R & D Tire and Automotive Center, also in Bemidji, from 1985–2008.

Minnesota House of Representatives
Hancock was first elected to the House in 2010. He served on the Environment, Energy and Natural Resources Policy and Finance, the Government Operations and Elections, and the Higher Education Policy and Finance committees during the 2011–12 session. He did not seek re-election in 2016.

References

External links

 Project Votesmart - Rep. David Hancock Profile

Living people
1945 births
People from Bemidji, Minnesota
Republican Party members of the Minnesota House of Representatives
21st-century American politicians